Richard Carlton Seaver (June 10, 1922June 10, 2007) was an American oil drilling executive and philanthropist.

References

American businesspeople in the oil industry
American philanthropists
1922 births
2007 deaths
Pomona College alumni
University of California, Berkeley alumni
Pomona College trustees
20th-century American academics